Elohim, the plural of , is a Hebrew word meaning "gods". Although the word is plural, in the Hebrew Bible it usually takes a singular verb and refers to a single deity, particularly (but not always) the God of Israel.  At other times, it refers to deities in the plural.

Morphologically, the word is the plural form of the word eloah and related to el.  It is cognate to the word l-h-m which is found in Ugaritic, where it is used as the pantheon for Canaanite gods, the children of El, and conventionally vocalized as "Elohim". Most uses of the term Elohim in the later Hebrew text imply a view that is at least monolatrist at the time of writing, and such usage (in the singular), as a proper title for the supreme deity, is generally not considered to be synonymous with the term elohim, "gods" (plural, simple noun). Rabbinic scholar Maimonides wrote that the various other usages are commonly understood to be homonyms.

One theory suggests that the notion of divinity underwent radical changes in the early period of Israelite identity and development of Ancient Hebrew religion. In this view, the ambiguity of the term elohim is the result of such changes, cast in terms of "vertical translatability", i.e. the re-interpretation of the gods of the earliest recalled period as the national god of monolatrism as it emerged in the 7th to 6th century BCE in the Kingdom of Judah and during the Babylonian captivity, and further in terms of monotheism by the emergence of Rabbinical Judaism in the 2nd century CE.

Grammar and etymology

The word elohim or 'elohiym (ʼĕlôhîym) is a grammatically plural noun for "gods" or "deities" or various other words in Biblical Hebrew.

In Hebrew, the ending -im normally indicates a masculine plural. However, when referring to the Jewish God, Elohim is usually understood to be grammatically singular (i.e. it governs a singular verb or adjective). In Modern Hebrew, it is often referred to in the singular despite the -im ending that denotes plural masculine nouns in Hebrew.

It is generally thought that Elohim is derived from eloah, the latter being an expanded form of the Northwest Semitic noun 'il. The related nouns eloah and el are used as proper names or as generics, in which case they are interchangeable with elohim. The term contains an added heh as third radical to the biconsonantal root. Discussions of the etymology of elohim essentially concern this expansion. An exact cognate outside of Hebrew is found in Ugaritic ʾlhm, the family of El, the creator god and chief deity of the Canaanite pantheon, in Biblical Aramaic ʼĔlāhā and later Syriac Alaha ("God"), and in Arabic ʾilāh ("god, deity") (or Allah as "The [single] God"). "El" (the basis for the extended root ʾlh) is usually derived from a root meaning "to be strong" and/or "to be in front".

Canaanite religion

The word el (singular) is a standard term for "god" in Aramaic, paleo-Hebrew, and other related Semitic languages including Ugaritic. The Canaanite pantheon of gods was known as 'ilhm, the Ugaritic equivalent to elohim. For instance, the Ugaritic Baal Cycle mentions "seventy sons of Asherah". Each "son of god" was held to be the originating deity for a particular people (KTU 2 1.4.VI.46).

Usage

Elohim occurs frequently throughout the Torah. In some cases (e.g. , "Elohim called unto him out of the midst of the bush ..."), it behaves like a singular noun in Hebrew grammar, and is then generally understood to denote the single God of Israel. In other cases, Elohim acts as an ordinary plural of the word Eloah, and refers to the polytheistic notion of multiple gods (for example, "You shall have no other gods before me").

The phrase bene elohim, translated "sons of the Gods", has an exact parallel in Ugaritic and Phoenician texts, referring to the council of the gods.

Elohim occupy the seventh rank of ten in the medieval rabbinic scholar Maimonides' Jewish angelic hierarchy. Maimonides said: "I must premise that every Hebrew [now] knows that the term Elohim is a homonym, and denotes God, angels, judges, and the rulers of countries, ..."

With plural verb
In the Hebrew Bible, elohim is used with a plural verb. The witch of Endor told Saul that she saw elohim ascending (olim , plural verb) out of the earth when she summoned the spirit of the Prophet Samuel at Saul's request. The word elohim, in this context, can refer to spirits as well as deities. Some traditional Jewish sources say that the spirits of deceased human beings are being referred to. The Babylonian Talmud states: "olim indicates that there were two of them. One of them was Samuel, but the other, who was he? - Samuel went and brought Moses with him." Rashi also gives this interpretation in his commentary on the verse. Regarding this Sforno states that "every disembodied creature is known as elohim; this includes the soul of human beings known as [the] "Image of God".

In , Abraham, before the polytheistic Philistine king Abimelech, says that "Elohim (translated as God) caused (plural verb) me to wander". Whereas the Greek Septuagint (LXX) has a singular verb form (ἐξήγαγε(ν), aorist II), most English versions usually translate this as "God caused" (which does not distinguish between a singular and plural verb). Regarding this, the Jerusalem Talmud states: "All Names written regarding our father Abraham are holy [i.e. referring to the one God] except one which is profane, it was when the gods made me err from my father’s house. But some say this one also is holy, [i.e.] 'were it not for God, they [humans] already would have made me err.' " The same disagreement appears in Tractate Soferim, where Haninah ben Ahi R. Joshua maintained that the word is "holy". An alternative view (held by Onkelos, Bahya ben Asher, Jacob ben Asher, Sforno and R. Yaakov Tzvi Mecklenburg) is that the word means "gods", and the verse means that Abraham's distaste for the idolatry of his father Terah led him to decide to wander far from home. Others such as Chizkuni interpret elohim as a reference to wicked rulers such as Amraphel (often equated with Nimrod).

In , Jacob built an altar at El-Bethel "because there elohim revealed himself [plural verb] to [Jacob]". The verb niglu ("revealed himself") is plural, even though one would expect the singular. This is one of several instances where the Bible uses plural verbs with the name elohim. Some Jewish sources (e.g. Targum Jonathan, Ibn Ezra, Chizkuni) seeking to explain the plural language of Genesis 35:7, translating elohim here as "angels", noting that in the story being referenced Jacob experienced a vision of malakhei elohim (angels of God) ascending and descending the ladder.

With singular verb
Elohim, when meaning the God of Israel, is mostly grammatically singular, and is commonly translated as "God", and capitalised. In the traditional Jewish understanding of the verse, the plural refers to God taking council with His Angels (who He had created by this point) before creating Adam. It should also be noted that in the following verse of Genesis 1:27: "So God created man in his [own] image, in the image of God He created him; male and female He created them."; the singular verb בָּרָא (bārāʾ), meaning "He created" is used as it is elsewhere in all the acts of creation featured in Genesis. This shows us that the actual creation of man (and everything else) in Genesis was a singular act by God alone.

Wilhelm Gesenius and other Hebrew grammarians traditionally described this as the pluralis excellentiae (plural of excellence), which is similar to the pluralis majestatis (plural of majesty, or "Royal we").
Gesenius comments that the singular Hebrew term Elohim is to be distinguished from elohim used to refer to plural gods, and remarks that:

The treatment of Elohim as both singular and plural is, according to Mark Sameth, consistent with a theory put forth by Guillaume Postel (16th century) and Michelangelo Lanci (19th century) that the God of Israel was understood by the ancient priests to be a singular, dual-gendered deity.

In the Septuagint and New Testament translations, Elohim has the singular  even in these cases, and modern translations follow suit in giving "God" in the singular. The Samaritan Torah has edited out some of these exceptions.

Angels and judges
In a few cases in the Greek Septuagint (LXX), Hebrew elohim with a plural verb, or with implied plural context, was rendered either angeloi ("angels") or to kriterion tou Theou ("the judgement of God"). These passages then entered first the Latin Vulgate, then the English King James Version (KJV) as "angels" and "judges", respectively. From this came the result that James Strong, for example, listed "angels" and "judges" as possible meanings for elohim with a plural verb in his Strong's Concordance, and the same is true of many other 17th-20th century reference works. Both Gesenius' Hebrew Lexicon and the Brown–Driver–Briggs Lexicon list both "angels" and "judges" as possible alternative meanings of elohim with plural verbs and adjectives.

Gesenius and Ernst Wilhelm Hengstenberg have questioned the reliability of the Septuagint translation in this matter. Gesenius lists the meaning without agreeing with it. Hengstenberg stated that the Hebrew Bible text never uses elohim to refer to "angels", but that the Septuagint translators refused the references to "gods" in the verses they amended to "angels".

The Greek New Testament (NT) quotes  in Hebrews 2:6b-8a, where the Greek NT has "ἀγγέλους" (angelous) in vs. 7, quoting  (8:6 in the LXX), which also has "ἀγγέλους" in a version of the Greek Septuagint. In the KJV, elohim (Strong's number H430) is translated as "angels" only  in Psalm 8:5.

Angels cited in the Hebrew Bible and external literature often contain the related noun ʾĒl in their theophoric names such as Michael and Gabriel.

Other plural-singulars in biblical Hebrew
The Hebrew language has several nouns with -im (masculine plural) and -oth (feminine plural) endings which nevertheless take singular verbs, adjectives and pronouns. For example, Baalim, Adonim, Behemoth. This form is known as the "honorific plural", in which the pluralization is a sign of power or honor. A very common singular Hebrew word with plural ending is the word achoth, meaning sister, with the irregular plural form achioth.

Alternatively, there are several other frequently used words in the Hebrew language that contain a masculine plural ending but also maintain this form in singular concept.  The major examples are:  Sky/Heavens (שמים - shamayim), Face (פנים - panim), Life (חיים - chayyim), Water (מים - mayim).  Of these four nouns, three appear in the first sentence of Genesis (along with elohim). Three of them also appear in the first sentence of the Eden creation story (also along with elohim).  Instead of "honorific plural" these other plural nouns terms represent something which is constantly changing. Water, sky, face, life are "things which are never bound to one form."

The Divine Council

Marti Steussy, in Chalice Introduction to the Old Testament, discusses: "The first verse of Psalm 82: 'Elohim has taken his place in the divine council.' Here elohim has a singular verb and clearly refers to God. But in verse 6 of the Psalm, God says to the other members of the council, 'You [plural] are elohim.' Here elohim has to mean gods."

Mark Smith, referring to this same Psalm, states in God in Translation: "This psalm presents a scene of the gods meeting together in divine council ... Elohim stands in the council of El. Among the elohim he pronounces judgment: ..."

In Hulsean Lectures for..., H. M. Stephenson discussed Jesus' argument in  concerning Psalm 82. (In answer to the charge of blasphemy Jesus replied:) "Is it not written in your law, I said, Ye are gods. If he called them gods, unto whom the word of God came, and the scripture cannot be broken; Say ye of him, whom the Father hath sanctified, and sent into the world, Thou blasphemest; because I said, I am the Son of God?" – "Now what is the force of this quotation 'I said ye are gods.' It is from the Asaph Psalm which begins 'Elohim hath taken His place in the mighty assembly. In the midst of the Elohim He is judging.

Sons of God

The Hebrew word for "son" is ben; plural is bānim (with the construct state form being "benei"). The Hebrew term benei elohim ("sons of God" or "sons of the gods") in  compares to the use of "sons of gods" (Ugaritic: b'n il) sons of El in Ugaritic mythology. Karel van der Toorn states that gods can be referred to collectively as bene elim, bene elyon, or bene elohim.

Elohist

The Hebrew Bible uses various names for the God of Israel. According to the documentary hypothesis, these variations are the products of different source texts and narratives that constitute the composition of the Torah: Elohim is the name of God used in the Elohist (E) and Priestly (P) sources, while Yahweh is the name of God used in the Jahwist (J) source. Form criticism postulates the differences of names may be the result of geographical origins; the P and E sources coming from the North and J from the South. There may be a theological point, that God did not reveal his name, Yahweh, before the time of Moses, though Hans Heinrich Schmid showed that the Jahwist was aware of the prophetic books from the 7th and 8th centuries BCE.

The Jahwist source presents Yahweh anthropomorphically: for example, walking through the Garden of Eden looking for Adam and Eve. The Elohist source often presents Elohim as more distant and frequently involves angels, as in the Elohist version of the tale of Jacob's Ladder, in which there is a ladder to the clouds, with angels climbing up and down, with Elohim at the top. In the Jahwist version of the tale, Yahweh is simply stationed in the sky, above the clouds without the ladder or angels. Likewise, the Elohist source describes Jacob wrestling with an angel.

The classical documentary hypothesis, first developed in the late 19th century among biblical scholars and textual critics, holds that the Jahwist portions of the Torah were composed in the 10th-9th century BCE and the Elohist portions in the 9th-8th century BCE, i.e. during the early period of the Kingdom of Judah. This, however, is not universally accepted as later literary scholarship seems to show evidence of a later "Elohist redaction" (post-exilic) during the 5th century BCE which sometimes makes it difficult to determine whether a given passage is "Elohist" in origin, or the result of a later editor.

Latter Day Saint movement

In the Latter Day Saint movement and Mormonism, Elohim refers to God the Father. Elohim is the father of Jesus in both the physical and the spiritual realms, whose name before birth is said to be Jehovah.

In the belief system held by the Christian churches that adhere to the Latter Day Saint movement and most Mormon denominations, including the Church of Jesus Christ of Latter-day Saints (LDS Church), the term God refers to Elohim (the Eternal Father), whereas Godhead means a council of three distinct gods: Elohim (God the Father), Jehovah (the Son of God, Jesus Christ), and the Holy Ghost, in a non-trinitarian conception of the Godhead. In Mormonism, the three persons are considered to be physically separate beings, or personages, but united in will and purpose; this conception differs significantly from mainline Christian trinitarianism. As such, the term Godhead differs from how it is used in mainstream Christianity. This description of God represents the orthodoxy of the LDS Church, established early in the 19th century.

The Book of Abraham, a sacred text accepted by some branches of the Latter Day Saint movement, contains a paraphrase of the first chapter of Genesis which explicitly translates Elohim as "the Gods" multiple times; this is suggested by Mormon apostle James E. Talmage to indicate a "plurality of excellence or intensity, rather than distinctively of
number".

Raëlism

The new religious movement and UFO religion International Raëlian Movement, founded by the French journalist Claude Vorilhon (who later became known as "Raël") in 1974, claims that the Hebrew word Elohim from the Book of Genesis actually means “those who came from the sky” and refers to a species of extraterrestrial aliens.

Gnosticism
In the Gnostic text known as the Secret Book of John, Elohim is another name for Abel, whose parents are Eve and Yaldabaoth. He rules over the elements of water and earth, alongside Cain, who is seen as Yahweh ruling over the elements of fire and wind. However, the 2nd century Gnostic teacher Justin proposed a cosmological model with three original divinities. The first is a transcendental being called the Good, the second is Elohim, appearing here as an intermediate male figure, and the third is an Earth-mother called Eden. The world along with the first humans are created from the love between Elohim and Eden, but when Elohim learns about the existence of the Good above him and ascends trying to reach it, he causes evil to enter the universe.

See also
 Anunnaki
 
 Elyon
 Genesis creation narrative
 
 Names of God
 Theophory in the Bible
 Allahumma

Notes

References

General bibliography

External links
 , Strong's Concordance (1890).
 
 

Angels in Judaism
Angels
Creator gods
Deities in the Hebrew Bible
God
Hebrew Bible topics
Hebrew words and phrases in the Hebrew Bible
Latter Day Saint doctrines regarding deity
Magic words
Middle Eastern gods
Names of God in Christianity
Names of God in Judaism
West Semitic gods